Kuldre is a village in Võru County, in Antsla Parish, in southeastern Estonia. It was the administrative centre of Urvaste Parish. Kuldre has a population of 202 (as of 26 May 2004).

Gallery

References

External links
Antsla Parish
Kuldre School 

Villages in Võru County